General James Stuart  was a British Army officer who served in North America during the American Revolutionary War and took part in various campaigns in British India. He was the first General Officer Commanding, Ceylon and second Military Governor of British Ceylon. He was appointed on 1 March 1796 and was Governor until 1 January 1797. He was succeeded by Welbore Ellis Doyle.

Early life
Stuart was born on 2 March 1741. He was the third son of John Stuart of Blairhall in Perthshire. His mother was Anne, daughter of Francis Stuart, 7th Earl of Moray. Stuart was educated at schools in Culross and Dunfermline, Scotland. He studied law at the University of Edinburgh and then joined the British Army, serving in the American war of independence.

Military career

India and Ceylon
Promoted to major in the 78th Foot, he arrived in India in 1782 and was promoted to lieutenant-colonel on 14 February. He took part in Sir Eyre Coote's campaign against Hyder in the Second Anglo-Mysore War, and was present at the siege of Cuddalore where he commanded the attack on the right of the main position in the assault of 13 July 1782.

He served in the campaign of 1790, under General Sir William Medows, against Tipu Sultan, attacking the fortresses of Dindigul and Palghaut. He served under Cornwallis during the campaigns of 1791–2, and led the siege of Seringapatam, commanding the centre column in the assault of 6 February 1792. Promoted to colonel in August, he returned to Madras in 1794.

Promoted to major-general in 1795, he took command of the expedition against Dutch possessions in Ceylon that year. After the whole island was secured in 1796, Stuart became commander-in-chief in the same year of the forces in Madras.

He was made colonel of the 82nd Regiment of Foot in 1797, transferring the following year to the 72nd Regiment of Foot, a position he held until his death.

In 1799 he commanded the Bombay Army in the last war against Tipu, which occupied Coorg, and repulsed Tipu at Seedaseer on 6 March. On 15 March he joined with Major General George Harris (afterwards Lord Harris) before the 1799 Battle of Seringapatam and took charge of the operations on the northern side of the city. After its capture he received the thanks of both Houses of Parliament.

Later career and death
He became commander-in-chief of the Madras Army in 1801. Promoted to lieutenant-general in 1802, he took part in the Second Anglo-Maratha War in 1803 but in 1805 returned to England in bad health. He was promoted to the rank of full general on 1 January 1812.

He died without issue at Charles Street, Berkeley Square, London, on 29 April 1815 and was buried in a vault in St. James's Chapel, Hampstead Road, London.

References

 

|-
 

|-
 

|-

|-

1741 births
1815 deaths
British Army personnel of the American Revolutionary War
British military personnel of the Fourth Anglo-Mysore War
British Army generals
Commanders-in-chief of Bombay
British military personnel of the Second Anglo-Maratha War
Governors of British Ceylon
British expatriates in Sri Lanka
19th-century British people
General Officers Commanding, Ceylon
Alumni of the University of Edinburgh